Greatest Shit is a compilation album by KMFDM. It was released on September 28, 2010. This special edition version of Würst has the same track listing as that album on its first disc, and comes with a second disc of additional mixes and edits of new and classic KMFDM tracks.

Track listing

Disc 1

Disc 2

References

External links
KMFDM at Metropolis Records

KMFDM compilation albums
2010 compilation albums
Metropolis Records remix albums